A caption contest or caption competition is a competition between multiple participants, who are required to give the best description for a certain image offered by the contest organizer. Rules and information about the competition process are also given by the competition organizer.

General information 
Caption contest participants have to describe a given image as accurately and originally as possible. Contests may vary by image type (photo or drawing), caption format (description of a situation or a dialogue), as well as judging criteria. The competition organizer is required to give information about caption submission rules and other information that is important for the contest.

Caption contests are mainly arranged as an amusement, and they can be organized under different conditions (between separate individuals, in public events, mass media, etc.), as well as using various means (drawn pictures on paper, digital image, printed image, press publication, etc.). Traditionally, the most popular and typical format has been publication of caption contests in newspapers or magazines, but with the development of modern technologies, it is also very popular to organize caption contests on the Internet.

Caption contests can be used not only as an entertainment but also for other purposes, such as newspaper promotion, bringing forward a certain problem, or product advertisement. An important aspect of caption competition is to look at an object, event or issue from unusual point of view.

The caption, unless competition rules do not restrict, can be in any form of literary expression – prose, poetry, as one word or a word play. Usually the submitted captions are judged by the originality and wit, but not always the decisive assessment is humour. It is generally assumed that the caption has to describe image as precisely as possible, so both humour and precision are equally important.

As caption writing is an art of words, it is rarely possible to evaluate the superiority of one caption over others accurately and objectively. Consequently, the judging of submitted captions is usually quite subjective. Sometimes competition rules limit caption size, but usually the caption is no longer than one sentence (10–20 words). As an exception, the caption can consist of several sentences. Usually it is not allowed to use profane or offensive language in submitted captions.

In several caption contests, winners are awarded with prizes.

History 
It is considered that the origins of caption contests are related to the increase of popularity of cartoons and comics as well as widespread use of illustrations and the rise of photojournalism in printed media at the end of the 19th century. All these areas share the combination of words and images that could be multiplied and made available to a wide audience with the beginnings of mass printing and wide spread of newspapers and magazines.

From currently available information, the first caption contests in printed media appeared in the U.S. press of the late 19th century (such as Life magazine which was published from year 1883 to 1936). At that time these competitions were called picture title or picture headline contests, but their concept and meaning was identical to current caption contests. It must be considered, that the term caption in its present sense firstly appeared in English language only in the first half of the 20th century.

In the beginning of the 20th century, at least in the U.S. press (for example, The San Francisco Call, The Daily News, The Bridgeport Telegram) caption contests were already quite popular. In these competitions drawn pictures and cartoons were mainly used. Photo caption contests appeared little later with the improvement of printing quality (towards the second quarter of 20th century).

During the course of the 20th century, caption contests were published in printed media in many countries of the world. For example, in Soviet Union one of the first caption contests was published in daily newspaper Izvestia Sunday supplement Nedelya (The Week) at the beginning of the 1960s. Little later a newspaper Literaturnaya gazeta began to publish caption contests that became very popular and they are part of this newspaper up until now.

The spread of caption contests increased even more with the emergence of the Internet by the end of the 20th century, and at the beginning of the 21st century. Internet has made the organization of caption contests and participation in them possible for wide audiences across the world.

Present situation 
Although a considerable amount of caption contests are now on Internet, caption contests in printed media still exist and are quite popular. A very popular and prominent is a weekly caption contest published in American magazine The New Yorker. The contest first appeared in 1998 and has been published regularly in each issue since 2005. Each week several thousand participants take part in this competition. On the Internet, a very popular is the weekly caption competition on BBC website (Magazine Monitor section), held since 2006.

Along the traditional caption contests, there have appeared different forms of this genre such as anti-caption contests for worst submitted caption and reverse caption contests where the most suitable picture must be submitted for a given caption. There are also caption contests devoted to particular themes such as history or football.

In 2006, the website caption.me  (then captioncompetition.co.uk) was founded, featuring user-submitted photos and captions.

The New Yorker magazine, noting the popularity of its cartoon caption contest, has created a caption contest board game and issued a book with the most interesting cartoons and winning captions as well as comprehensive information covering this theme.

Also concerning the New Yorker caption contest, several scientific studies have been carried out: researchers from University of New Mexico, Department of Anthropology, in 2010 have compared humour ability in males and females in context of this competition; members of The New Yorker editorial board and University of Colorado Boulder Leeds School of Business in 2011 analysed several thousand entries of this contest to study the concept of humour.

Future perspectives 
The future of caption contests depends on the imagination and creativity of their organizers and participants, as well as future development of information and communication technologies.

In popular culture 
In U.S. TV series The Office, seventh-season episode "The Search", its character Pam starts a caption contest in the office, with her co-worker Gabe instituting rules that no one wants to follow.

In British sitcom Green Wing, the second series, episode six, its character Alan Statham wins a caption competition on the Consultant Radiologists International website, an organisation of which Alan claims to be an "Esteemed member".

In a children's novel Absolute Zero by Helen Cresswell its character Uncle Parker has won a trip to the Caribbean in a caption contest. The rest of the family immediately enter similar competitions in an attempt to better his prize but, much of the time, beating the others to an entry form is a victory in itself.

In season two of the HBO series Bored to Death, George (played by Ted Danson) struggles to caption a New Yorker cartoon, which portrays a police duck interacting with a suicidal bear.

References

Further reading 
 Mendrinos, James (2004). The Complete Idiot's Guide to Comedy Writing. Indianapolis: Alpha Books. .
 Sale, Jonathan (1981). If the Caption Fits: The Best of the Punch Caption Competition. London: Elm Tree Books. .
 Glasser, Selma (1980). The Complete Guide to Prize Contests, Sweepstakes, and How to Win Them. New York: F. Fell Publishers. .
 LaRocque, Paul (2003). Heads You Win!: An Easy Guide to Better Headline and Caption Writing. Portland: Marion Street Press. .

External links 
 BBC Magazine Monitor caption competition
 "The New Yorker" magazine caption contest
 Giggle Trigger - Survival of the Wittiest - Daily Caption contest

Humour
Leisure activities
Entertainment
Competitions